The Transport and General Workers' Union (TGWU or T&G) was one of the largest general trade unions in the United Kingdom and Ireland – where it was known as the Amalgamated Transport and General Workers' Union  (ATGWU) to differentiate itself from the Irish Transport and General Workers' Union – with 900,000 members (and was once the largest trade union in the world).  It was founded in 1922 and Ernest Bevin served as its first general secretary.

In 2007, it merged with Amicus to form Unite the Union.

History
At the time of its creation in 1922, the TGWU was the largest and most ambitious amalgamation brought about within trade unionism. Its structure combined regional organisation, based on Districts and Areas, with committee organisation by occupation, based on six broad Trade Groups. Trade groups were not closely linked to trades, but were elected by activists. Officials of the union were grouped by region, and could be asked to serve each or any trade group.

Docks Group
The Docks Group was created in 1922 to represent former members of the following unions:
Dock, Wharf, Riverside and General Labourers' Union of Great Britain and Ireland
Labour Protection League (London, est. 1889)
National Amalgamated Coal Porters' Union of Inland and Seaborne Coal Workers (London, est. 1889)
National Amalgamated Labourers' Union of Great Britain and Ireland (Cardiff, est. 1889)
North of England Trimmers' and Teemers' Association (est. 1871)

The group originally had a subsection for coal shipping.  In 1928, it had 96,000 members, but over time, membership of the group declined along with employment on the docks, dropping to 56,000 in 1966, and had 51,153 in 1980.

Waterways Group
The Waterways Group was created in 1922 to represent former members of the Amalgamated Society of Watermen, Lightermen and Bargemen.  Always one of the smallest sections, it had only 8,000 members in 1928, and 16,000 in 1966.  In 1970, it was merged into the Docks Group.

Administrative, Clerical and Supervisory Group
The Administrative, Clerical and Supervisory Group was created in 1922 to represent former members of the following unions:
National Association of Ships' Clerks, Grain Weighers and Coalmeters
National Union of Docks, Wharves and Shipping Staffs

There was often ambiguity in the TGWU over the actual name of its white-collar section. From the 1960s it was generally known as ACTS (Administrative, Clerical, Technical and Supervisory) but also sometimes as the ACTSS (Association of Clerical, Technical and Supervisory Staff) and enamel union badges bearing both sets of initials were produced for members. It was noted for an enquiry by the Certification Office in 2006 into board members who had joined the union within six months of being elected to senior posts.

The group grew significantly over time, having only 5,000 members in 1928, but 62,000 by 1966, and 149,801 members in 1980.

Road Transport (Passenger and Commercial) Groups
The Road Transport group was created in 1922 to represent former members of the following unions:
Amalgamated Association of Carters and Motormen (Leeds, est. 1916)
Amalgamated Carters, Lurrymen and Motormen's Union (Bolton, est. 1890)
Associated Horsemen's Union (Greenock, est. 1894)
National Union of Vehicle Workers
North of Scotland Horse and Motormen's Association (Dundee, 1911)
United Vehicle Workers

Later in 1922, the group was split into Road Transport (Passenger) and Road Transport (Commercial) groups.  The Passenger group had 79,000 members in 1928 and 181,000 in 1966, but by 1980, the renamed Passenger Services group had dropped to only 44,501 members.  The Commercial Services group rose from 37,000 members in 1928 to 219,000 in 1966, and 226,290 in 1980.

General Workers Group
The General Workers Group was created in 1922 to cater for all workers in jobs which did not fall into another group.  Initially, it had subsections for workers in metal and chemical trades.  Once it was considered that a particular field had enough members to justify its own trade group, it was split out.  These decisions were made at the Biennial Delegate Conference, and although there were many applications to form new trade groups, most were unsuccessful.  The group had 68,000 members in 1928, and it then doubled in size when the Workers' Union merged into the TGWU.  By 1966, it had 338,000 members and, despite the splitting out of further groups in 1970, by 1980 it still had 269,845 members.

The first groups to be split out were:
 Power Workers, formed in 1926 from the National Amalgamated Union of Enginemen, Firemen, Mechanics, Motormen and Electrical Workers.  It had 20,000 members in 1928, rising to 41,000 by 1966.
 Engineering, formed in 1931, principally from members of the Workers' Union.  By 1966, it had 269,000 members.
 Government, formed in 1943, with 58,000 members by 1966.
 Municipal, formed in 1945, with 44,000 members by 1966.
 Agricultural, formed in 1945, with 13,000 members by 1966.
 Building, formed in 1953, with 53,000 members by 1966.
 Chemical, formed in 1953, with 61,000 members by 1966.

Later mergers

The Scottish Union of Dock Labourers and National Union of Dock, Riverside and General Workers in Great Britain and Ireland initially voted not to amalgamate, but a new voted changed their position, and they joined before the end of 1922, along with the Amalgamated Carters, Lurrymen and Motormen's Union, Greenock Sugar Porters' Union, Dundee Flax and Jute Stowers' Society, National Union of British Fishermen, and Belfast Breadservers' Association.  Some of these unions retained a great deal of autonomy and in many ways effectively functioned as separate unions, even being registered separately with the Registrar of Friendly Societies.  The biggest merger was with the Workers' Union in 1929, the union being fully integrated into the TGWU in 1931.

Campaigns
The Transport and General Workers' Union spearheaded the campaign for the registration of Gangmasters in the UK, sponsoring an Act of Parliament which received the Royal Assent on 8 July 2004.

Merger with Amicus 
During 2005 discussions started between the TGWU, Amicus and the GMB about the possibility of merging the three unions into one organisation with potentially 2.5 million members covering almost every sector of the economy. On 14 June 2006 the GMB Conference voted not to continue with discussions although the other two unions are proceeding, with delegates approving the proposed 'Instrument of Amalgamation' at a special conference on 18 December 2006.  The ballot of both unions' membership during February and early March 2007, also approved the merger.  The result of the ballot was announced on 8 March 2007: 86.4 per cent of T&G members and 70.1 per cent of Amicus members voted to support the merger, from a turnout of 27% at a time of low membership consultation.  The press release announced that the resulting union had the working title "New Union" and the name would be decided by a ballot of the membership. However, on 2 April 2007, The Times reported that the name Unite had been chosen. and that full merger of rule books and governing bodies may soon follow the existing merger of personnel and finance departments

Affiliations 
 Labour Party (UK)
 Labour Party (Republic of Ireland)
 Trades Union Congress (TUC)
 Irish Congress of Trade Unions (ICTU)
 Scottish Trades Union Congress (STUC)
 International Transport Workers' Federation (ITF)
 International Metalworkers' Federation (IMF)
 Union Network International (UNI)
 International Union of Food, Agricultural, Hotel, Restaurant, Catering, Tobacco and Allied Workers' Association (IUF)
 Public Services International (PSI)
 International Federation of Building and Woodworkers (IFBW)
 International Textile, Garment and Leather Workers' Federation (ITLGW)
 International Federation of Chemical, Energy, Mine and General Workers' Unions (ICEM)
Regions – particularly Region One which covered London, the South East and Eastern England, also had a tradition of donating to other causes, as did branch committees, which controlled a substantial proportion of membership income.

Officers

General Secretaries 
1922: Ernest Bevin
1945: Arthur Deakin (acting from 1940)
1955: Jock Tiffin
1956: Frank Cousins
1964: Harry Nicholas (acting)
1969: Jack Jones
1978: Moss Evans
1985: Ron Todd
1992: Bill Morris
2003: Tony Woodley

Deputy General Secretaries
1974: Harry Urwin
1980: Alec Kitson
1986: Bill Morris
1992: Jack Adams
1999: Margaret Prosser
2002: Tony Woodley
2003: Jack Dromey

Assistant General Secretaries
1924: John Cliff
1935: Arthur Deakin
1945: Harold Clay
1948: Jock Tiffin
1955: Frank Cousins
1956: Harry Nicholas
1968: Harry Urwin
1974: Vacant
1985: Eddie Haigh and Larry Smith
1988: Eddie Haigh
1991: Vacant?
1999: Barry Camfield and Jimmy Elsby

Amalgamations 
The list of TGWU amalgamations highlights the scale of the TGWU policy of mergers, amalgamations and transfers of engagements, which contributed to its membership growth and the spread of its membership base.

See also 

 Bristol Bus Boycott, 1963
 TGWU amalgamations
 Transport House

References

External links
 The history of the T&G
 Catalogue of the TGWU archives, held at the Modern Records Centre, University of Warwick
 Catalogue of the TGWU West Midlands Region archives, held at the Modern Records Centre, University of Warwick
 Catalogue of the TGWU Coventry District archives, held at the Modern Records Centre, University of Warwick
 T&GWU website archived on 30 April 2007

 
Unite the Union
Defunct trade unions of the United Kingdom
Transport trade unions in the United Kingdom
Transport trade unions in Ireland
Defunct trade unions of Ireland
International Transport Workers' Federation
International Union of Food, Agricultural, Hotel, Restaurant, Catering, Tobacco and Allied Workers' Associations
Trade unions established in 1922
1922 establishments in the United Kingdom
Trade unions disestablished in 2007
2007 disestablishments in the United Kingdom
Defunct transport organisations based in the United Kingdom
Trade unions based in London